LeRoy Bell (born August 8, 1951) is an American singer and songwriter. He and his friend Casey James played in Special Blend, and then went on to form their own duo Bell and James, also composing songs that were hits for other artists most notably two charting hit singles for Elton John. Later Bell became a member of the trio Only Friends. In 2011, Bell applied for the American The X Factor and was chosen for the Final 16 and went on to the live shows being mentored by Nicole Scherzinger. He was eliminated after the fifth live show finishing 8th overall in the inaugural season of the American The X Factor when he was in bottom three with Marcus Canty and Lakoda Rayne.

Background

LeRoy Martez Bell was born in Florida on August 8, 1951. He is a son of Leroy and Janice Marie (Zaragoza) Bell. His father is the half-brother of music producer Thom Bell. As  a military family, they moved frequently, until settling in Tacoma, Washington in 1965.

Bell and James

Bell and James was a duo soul group formed by LeRoy Bell (on drums and guitar) and Casey James (on guitar, bass and keyboards). They both had played for a while in the band Special Blend, before they decided to team up together as Bell and James. The duo released three albums: Bell and James (1978), Only Make Believe (1979) and In Black and White (1980), and had a number of singles, the most successful and well-known being "Livin' It Up (Friday Night)" released on A&M Records. It reached #15 on the U.S. Hot 100.

LeRoy also released his own EP "Spending Time" on his own label, Martez Music Group, releasing "Two Sides to Every Story" from the EP as a single.

Songwriting
LeRoy Bell also co-wrote many songs for others in partnership with Casey James. They were encouraged by LeRoy's uncle Thom Bell who owned Mighty Three Music, a music production company along with Kenny Gamble and Leon Huff. The latter were a famous composing duo collaboration Gamble and Huff to whom Bell and James provided some of their compositions.

Their songs were recorded by a number of artists including:
The Spinners
The O'Jays (notably in "This Time Baby")
The Temptations
Rita Marley
Gladys Knight & the Pips
Freda Payne
The Three Degrees

With Elton John
Most notably, two of the LeRoy Bell songs were recorded by Elton John. One was "Mama Can't Buy You Love" and the other "Are You Ready for Love". The songs, LeRoy Bell-Casey James co-compositions, appeared in "The Thom Bell Sessions" in 1977. Elton John's version of "Mama Can't Buy You Love" went to the Top 10 in the general charts and #1 on the Adult/Contemporary chart in the fall of 1979, earning Elton a Grammy Nomination for "Best Male R&B Vocal Performance". His song "Are You Ready for Love" did not chart.

Track list of Elton John single:
Side 1: "Are You Ready for Love" (LeRoy Bell, Thom Bell, Casey James) (8:31)
Side 2.1: "Three Way Love Affair" (LeRoy Bell, Casey James) (5:31)
Side 2.2: "Mama Can't Buy You Love" (LeRoy Bell, Casey James) (4:03)

In February 1989, The Complete Thom Bell Sessions was released by MCA Records, although it had been recorded in 1977. In addition to "Mama Can't Buy You Love" and "Are You Ready for Love", it featured three additional songs, including "Country Love Song" also co-written by LeRoy Bell.
1. "Nice and Slow" (Elton John, Bernie Taupin, Thom Bell)
2. "Country Love Song" (LeRoy Bell, Casey James)
3. "Shine on Through" (Elton John, G. Osborne)
4. "Mama Can't Buy You Love" (LeRoy Bell, Casey James)
5. "Are You Ready for Love" (LeRoy Bell, Casey James)
6. "Three Way Love Affair" (LeRoy Bell, Casey James)

In 2003, Fat Boy Slim mixed Elton John's single version making it to the British Singles Chart. The song also charted in many European charts.

With Teddy Pendergrass
LeRoy Bell had a long-running cooperation with Teddy Pendergrass for whom he wrote 5 songs in three different albums: 
1979: "I'll Never See Heaven Again" on the album Teddy
1979: "Set Me Free", also on album Teddy
1982: "Loving You Was Good" on album This One's for You 
1983: "Heaven Only Knows" from the album Heaven Only Knows (lead song) Pendergrass album 
1990: "Glad to Be Alive" from the album Truly BlessedOthers:
1979: Lou Rawls: "Bark, Bite (Fight All Night)" on the album Let Me Be Good to You1980: Lou Rawls: "Heartache (Just When You Think You're Loved)" and "You Are" on album Sit Down and Talk to Me 
1988: Kimiko Kasai: "Love Talk" from album Love Talk (lead song)
2001: Me and You: "You Never Know What You Got (Til It's Gone)"
2002: Jennifer Lopez: "Still" cowritten with James and Jennifer Lopez herself in the latter's album This Is Me... Then. 
2005: The Freemasons: "Love on My Mind" that appears on albums Shakedown, Unmixed and Shakedown 2He has also written for Phyllis Hyman

Solo career
Starting in the 2000s, he worked solo and toured extensively. In the process, he released various albums including his debut solo EP Spending Time (on his own label Martez Music Group), followed by Two Sides to Every Story in 2006,  A Change Is Coming in 2008 and Traces in 2010.

In 2011, he was part of a project United in Song affiliated to USA For Africa to bring the best in World Music to celebrate peace and unity. The project included Angelique Kidjo, Michael Franti & Spearhead, Aurelio Martinez with Youssou N'Dour, Lila Downs, Sierra Leone's Refugee All Stars, Razia Said, Abigail Washburn & the Shanghai Restoration Project, Luisa Maita, G Love & Special Sauce, and Vieux Farka Toure and LeRoy Bell contributing tracks to United in SongLeRoy Bell and His Only Friends

LeRoy Bell also formed his band Only Friends as LeRoy Bell and His Only Friends, featuring Terry Morgan on bass and Davis Martin on drums. Both are experience musicians. Morgan had played with Dee Daniels, Pat Wright & The Total Experience Gospel Choir, Dave Lewis, Thelma Houston and others, whereas Martin was previously a member of the band Maktub.

The X Factor
In 2011, he applied for the American version of The X Factor, singing the song "Lean on Me" at his audition. Becoming one of the Top 32, he performed in Judges House Bob Dylan's "Make You Feel My Love" in front of Enrique Iglesias and mentor Nicole Scherzinger becoming one of the finalists (final 16), qualifying for the live shows in the over 30s category mentored by Scherzinger.

During the live shows, he had the following performances:

Performances and results

On November 22, 2011, he was voted bottom three by public vote and had to sing for survival against Marcus Canty. He chose to sing The Beatles song "Don't Let Me Down". The result went to deadlock and the public vote revealed Bell had received the fewer votes and accordingly was eliminated after Live Show 5 finishing 8th overall in competition.

Discography

 Albums 
 As part of Bell and James 
1978: Bell and James1979: Only Make Believe1980: In Black and White With others 
2020: Stony Hill with G.E. Smith

 Solo 
2004: Spending Time (EP) (on his own label Martez Music Group)
2006: Two Sides to Every Story2008: A Change Is Coming2010: Traces As LeRoy Bell and His Only Friends 
2007: Live in 3D2013: Rock 'N Soul Singles 
 As part of Bell and James 
1979: Livin' It Up (Friday Night)1979: Shakedown1979: You Never Know What You've Got1980: Only Make Believe Solo Two Sides to Every Story Featuring 
2013: Miss Me'' with Paolo Noise

References

External links
LeRoy Bell Official website
LeRoy Bell Twitter
LeRoy Bell YouTube
LeRoy and His Only Friends Facebook

 1951 births
Living people
American multi-instrumentalists
20th-century American singers
20th-century African-American male singers
The X Factor (American TV series) contestants
20th-century American guitarists
21st-century American guitarists
20th-century American drummers
American male drummers
21st-century American drummers
American male guitarists
20th-century American male singers
21st-century American male singers
21st-century American singers
African-American guitarists
21st-century African-American male singers
Musicians from Florida